Benjamin Michael Woodside (born July 1, 1985) is an American former professional basketball player who spent the majority of his eight-year career playing in Europe.

College career
From 2005 to 2009, Woodside was a member of the North Dakota State Bison men's basketball team. As a senior in 2008–09, he was named Summit League Player of the Year. On December 12, 2008, he had a 60-point performance against Stephen F. Austin. Ten days later, Woodside became North Dakota State's career scoring leader in a 90–68 win over Northern Arizona. He went on to lead the Bison to win the Summit League tournament and qualify for the 2009 NCAA tournament in their first year of eligibility. In 2008–09, he averaged 23.2 points, 3.2 rebounds, 6.2 assists and 1.4 steals in 33 games.

College statistics

Professional career
After going undrafted in the 2009 NBA draft, Woodside joined the Minnesota Timberwolves summer league team. On August 7, 2009, he signed with French club BCM Gravelines for the 2009–10 season. In December 2009, he played in the French League All-Star game.

In July 2010, Woodside joined the Golden State Warriors summer league team. On August 2, 2010, he re-signed with BCM Gravelines. On December 4, 2011, he left Olimpija due to unpaid wages and immediately signed with BC Armia of the Georgian Superliga for the rest of the season.

On July 26, 2012, Woodside signed with Turkish club TED Ankara Kolejliler for the 2012–13 season.

On August 18, 2013, Woodside signed with the Italian club Vanoli Cremona for the 2013–14 season.

On July 3, 2014, Woodside signed with TED Ankara Kolejliler, returning to the club for a second stint. However, he was released by the club the following month after he failed physicals. On November 23, 2014, he signed with CB Sevilla of Spain for the rest of the season.

On June 8, 2015, Woodside signed with Turkish club Türk Telekom for the 2015–16 season.

On June 30, 2016, Woodside signed with the New Zealand Breakers for the 2016–17 NBL season. On November 8, 2016, he was ruled out for six to eight weeks after he ruptured the plantar fascia in his right foot. On January 7, 2017, he was released by the Breakers.

In April 2017, Woodside announced his retirement from basketball.

See also
 List of NCAA Division I men's basketball players with 60 or more points in a game

References

External links
 Ben Woodside at gobison.com
 Ben Woodside at fiba.com

1985 births
Living people
American expatriate basketball people in France
American expatriate basketball people in Georgia (country)
American expatriate basketball people in Italy
American expatriate basketball people in New Zealand
American expatriate basketball people in Slovenia
American expatriate basketball people in Spain
American expatriate basketball people in Turkey
American men's basketball players
Basketball players from Minnesota
BCM Gravelines players
Real Betis Baloncesto players
KK Olimpija players
Liga ACB players
New Zealand Breakers players
North Dakota State Bison men's basketball players
People from Albert Lea, Minnesota
Point guards
TED Ankara Kolejliler players
Türk Telekom B.K. players
Vanoli Cremona players